Niti Chaichitathorn (born 1981) nicknamed Pompam, is a Thai television host, creative, producer and actor, best known for co-hosting the lifestyle travel show Toey Tiew Thai and hosting the late-night talk show Talk with Toey.

Niti graduated from Chulalongkorn University's Faculty of Arts, and joined GMMTV, becoming head of the creative group at its cable/satellite Bang Channel, through which Toey Tiew Thai was originally broadcast and became widely known. He is openly gay, and both Toey Tiew Thai and Talk with Toey heavily feature queer-related themes (the titles are a play on the word kathoey 'ladyboy'). He has also had various acting roles in films and television series. He won Best Entertainment Presenter/Host at the 22nd Asian Television Awards, for Talk with Toey, in 2017.

References

Niti Chaichitathorn
Niti Chaichitathorn
Niti Chaichitathorn
Niti Chaichitathorn
Niti Chaichitathorn
1981 births
Living people